</noinclude>Castle Rock, known until 2007 as Tynemill is a British pub chain based in Nottingham and the East Midlands.  It was founded in 1977 by former Campaign for Real Ale (CAMRA) chairman Chris Holmes. Their first pub was the Old King Arms in Newark.  They have won the "Pub Group of the Year" award in 2002, 2006, and 2008.

They operate several pubs or cafe bar establishments which all have a policy of selling cask beers from regional and local microbreweries. They also own and operate the Castle Rock Brewery, a microbrewery located in Nottingham.  The old Tynemill brand name for the pubs has now been replaced by Castle Rock.

Many of their establishments are run as tenancies rather than managed public houses.

Tynemill pubs

Castle Rock Group of Pubs
Alexandra Hotel, Derby
Bread and Bitter, Mapperley
Derby Tup, Whittington Moor, Chesterfield
Eagle, Boston
Forest Tavern, Nottingham
Golden Eagle, Lincoln
Kean’s Head, Lace Market, Nottingham
Lincolnshire Poacher, Nottingham
New Barrack Tavern, Owlerton, Sheffield
Newshouse, Nottingham
Poppy and Pint, Lady Bay, Nottingham
Rook and Gaskill, York
Stratford Haven, West Bridgford, Nottingham
Vat & Fiddle, Nottingham

Associated companies
Victoria Hotel, Beeston – Hands on Pub Company Ltd
Reindeer Inn, Hoveringham – Hoveringham Inns Ltd
Canalhouse, Nottingham – Breakthrough Point Ltd
Swan in the Rushes, Loughborough – Swan in the Rushes Ltd

References

External links
Castle Rock Online

Companies based in Nottingham
British companies established in 1977
Pub chains